Shrikant Mohan Yadav is a film actor. He is known for Marathi films such as Valu (The Wild Bull), Deool, Ajoba, Ek Hazarachi Note, Highway and the upcoming Jaundya Na Balasaheb.

His performance in Marathi films Deool and Ajoba has been widely appreciated.

Filmography 
Section 375 (2019)
Lathe Joshi (2018)
Faster Fene (2017)
 Baghtos Kay Mujra Kar (2017)
 Jaundya Na Balasaheb (2016)
 Half Ticket (2016 film) (2016) 
 Highway (2015 film) (2015)
 Killa (film) (2015)
 Ek Hazarachi Note (2014) 
 Ajoba (2014)
 Pune 52 (2013)
 Night school (2012)
 Vihir (2009) 
 Bhirkit (2022)

References

External links

Male actors in Marathi cinema
Indian male film actors
Male actors from Pune
Year of birth missing (living people)
Living people